This is a list of Greek popes. Most were pope before or during the Byzantine Papacy (537–752). It does not include all the Sicilian and Syrian popes of Greek extraction from that period.

Pre-537

Pope Anacletus (79–92)
Pope Telesphorus (126–137)
Pope Hyginus (138–140)
Pope Eleuterus (174–189)
Pope Anterus (235–236)
Pope Stephen I (254–257)
Pope Sixtus II (257–258)
Pope Dionysius (259–268)
Pope Eusebius (309)
Antipope Heraclius (309 or 310)
Pope Zosimus (417–418)

537–753
Pope Boniface III (607)
Pope John IV (640-642)
Pope Theodore I (642–649)
Pope Agatho (678–681)
Pope Conon (686-687)
Pope John VI (701–705)
Pope John VII (705–707)
Pope Zachary (741–752)

Post-753

Antipope John XVI (997-998)
Antipope Alexander V (1409–1410)
Pope Innocent VIII (1484–1492), distant partial Greek ancestry
Pope Julius II (1503–1513), Greek mother and Italian father

See also
List of popes by nationality